Roxanne Bovenberg (born 30 July 1989, Vlaardingen) is a Dutch team handball player. She plays on the Dutch national team, and participated at the 2011 World Women's Handball Championship in Brazil.

References

1989 births
Living people
Dutch female handball players
People from Vlaardingen
Sportspeople from South Holland
21st-century Dutch women